The Allegan and Lake Shore Railroad is a defunct railroad which operated in Allegan County, Michigan during the 1880s. The company incorporated on May 30, 1883, by W.G. Dewing & Sons, to construct and operate  line from Allegan westward to Lake Michigan. The primary purpose of this line was to support local timber operations. On April 15, 1885, the A&LS completed a  narrow gauge  stretch from the Kalamazoo River at Allegan to Swan Creek; the line went no further and was abandoned in 1889, timber resources in the area being exhausted.

Notes

References 

1883 establishments in Michigan
1889 disestablishments in the United States
Transportation in Allegan County, Michigan
Defunct Michigan railroads
3 ft gauge railways in the United States
Narrow gauge railroads in Michigan